Alder Wood and Meadow is a  biological Site of Special Scientific Interest south-west of Corby in Northamptonshire.

The semi-natural ancient broadleaved woodland is a surviving fragment of the Royal Forest of Rockingham. It is mainly ash, and the ground flora on base rich soil includes tufted hair-grass, dog's mercury and enchanter's nightshade. The meadow is agriculturally unimproved, and it has surviving medieval ridge and furrow.

There is access by a footpath from Rushton.

References

Sites of Special Scientific Interest in Northamptonshire